Femunden is Norway's third largest lake and the second largest natural lake in Norway. The lake lies primarily in the municipality of Engerdal (in Innlandet) and also smaller parts are located in the municipalities of Os (Innlandet) and Røros (Trøndelag). Femundsmarka National Park borders the northeastern part of the lake.

 

Name
The first element (Fe- or Fem-) has no known meaning, and the last element is the suffix -mund or -und (both are common in Norwegian place names).

History
After Sweden had conquered the parishes of Idre and Särna in 1644 lake Femunden was considered to be part of the border between Norway and Sweden. But this was never officially recognised by Norway (or in reality by the Danish government, since Norway was ruled from Copenhagen in the early modern age), and during border adjustments in 1751 the Femundsmarka area east of the lake was granted to Norway from Sweden. Straight-line national borders are very unusual in Scandinavia, except in the very northernmost parts.

See also
 List of lakes in Norway
 MS Fæmund II

References

External links

 National Park Brochure from 2011 (English) 
 Map of Femund and the adjacent Femundsmarka National Park 
 Stereoscopic 3Dpicture and field recording of the Femundsmarka National Park

Engerdal
Os, Innlandet
Røros
Lakes of Innlandet
Lakes of Trøndelag
Bifurcation lakes